Born to Win is a 1971 black comedy crime drama film directed by Ivan Passer and starring George Segal, Karen Black, Paula Prentiss, Hector Elizondo, Jay Fletcher and Robert De Niro. Filming locations took place in Manhattan, specifically Times Square.

Plot
The film follows J (George Segal), a former hair dresser who has broken up with his wife (Paula Prentiss) and since become an aimless drug addict frequenting Times Square. He lives his new life by doing deals from time to time for Vivian (Hector Elizondo), a successful and intimidating drug dealer. J thinks his life is about love and peace yet he and his fellow friend and junkie Billy Dynamite (Jay Fletcher) try to steal a safe behind the back of a cashier. However, like in many of J's misadventures, they fail once confronted and chaotically flee the scene.

One day while trying to steal a car, J meets the car's owner, Parm (Karen Black), a free spirited girl who takes a liking to J. They go back to her apartment, with J intending to steal things from her, yet the two fall in love. While making love, Parm finds a tattoo on J's arm that says "Born to Win" - of which J is very proud.

When J returns to his routine, his drug habit grows, and, after dropping drugs off to Stanley (Irving Selbst), a prominent member of Vivian's supply chain, he and Billy return the next day to rob the drugs back from Stanley's girlfriend. They have to ditch the drugs, however, when, on their way out of the apartment, two dirty policemen (Ed Madsen and Robert De Niro) confront them and apprehend J. On the threat of serious jail time, J agrees to works alongside them by becoming a narc and to report to them on Vivian.

Stanley soon catches up to J, who narrowly escapes serious harm from his men. After making an airport delivery, J and Parm flee the city to the beach on Long Island. They brief fully experience romantic bliss, but he then insists on returning to the city for payment for the airport delivery. Upon returning, he faces further, increasingly intense pressure from Stanley and Vivian. The detectives force him to arrange a meeting with Vivian, who senses that it's a set up and refuses to make a deal.

J reunites with Billy and things seem more hopeful again. Billy tells J that he appreciates the certainty of purpose that their lifestyle provides. This relative calm doesn't last long, however. When together in an office building, Billy shoots up with drugs intended for J and immediately dies - the drugs were a "hot shot" intended to kill. A panicked and distraught J abandons his dead friend in the elevator. J and Parm make one last attempt to leave the city, but run into the detectives again who plant drugs on Parm and take her away for arrest. All of his plans having failed, J sinks deeper into turmoil with feelings of self-hatred and goes to Vivian's club. Vivian gives him free drugs and both he and J acknowledge that they could very easily be a hot shot. Alone and with his future completely uncertain, J sits alone on a bench in the middle of Times Square.

Cast

Filming

Ivan Passer and David Scott Milton started interviewing ex-addicts at the Phoenix House, near where they were putting on a play together titled Duet for Solo Voice. The resulting screenplay was originally much more serious in tone when shot. The comic elements were played up later during editing.

Milton based the characters in this film on the addicts who frequented the Manhattan diner he owned. He then adapted his observations of these characters into a play titled Scraping Bottom. The resulting screenplay for the film was titled Scraping Bottom. The copyright clearly can be read under the title as being credited to Scraping Bottom Productions.

Some of the characters in the film were played by actual junkies at the time, people who Passer encountered when researching the film.

The film was chosen to be screened at the New York Film Festival in October 1971.

The film was the first effort of a production company founded by George Segal and Jerry Tokofsky.

When Ed Madsen is chasing George Segal down the hallway, he slips and falls. This was not written in the screenplay. However, Passer thought it looked so real, he decided to leave it in the movie.

According to Passer, Robert De Niro nearly was fired many times throughout shooting. A devoted Stella Adler student, he did things to define his secondary character to draw attention from the leads.

Paula Prentiss received top billing, even though she appears on-screen for about three minutes. When asked about this at the press screening at the New York Film Festival, Passer said that her agent demanded it, adding "After all, what difference does it make?"

Reception
Born to Win received mixed reviews but many critics praised parts of it, including Segal's performance and the film's uniqueness. Chicago Sun-Times film critic Roger Ebert said of the film, "...a good-bad movie that doesn't always work but has some really brilliant scenes." Roger Greenspun of The New York Times wrote, "...is only Passer's second movie, and it is a dreadful disappointment — but not without its reasons, and not, I think, without some honor."

References

External links
 
 
 
 

1971 films
American black comedy films
Films set in New York City
Films shot in New York City
United Artists films
1970s black comedy films
Articles containing video clips
Films directed by Ivan Passer
Films with screenplays by Ivan Passer
1971 comedy films
1971 drama films
1970s English-language films
1970s American films